The following lists events that happened during 2017 in Libya.

Incumbents
Aguila Saleh Issa, President of the Council of Deputies, 5 August 2014-current
Abdullah al-Thani, Prime Minister, 11 March 2014-current

Events
Libyan Civil War (2014–present)

See also

Timeline of Libyan history

References

 
Libya
Libya